Colonel John Crimmin  (19 March 1859 – 20 February 1945) was an Irish recipient of the Victoria Cross, the highest and most prestigious award for gallantry in the face of the enemy that can be awarded to British and Commonwealth forces. He also served as the Hon. Physician to H.M. The King.

Details
He was 29 years old, and a Surgeon in the Bombay Medical Service, Indian Army during the Karen-Ni Expedition, Burma when the following deed took place for which he was awarded the VC.

On 1 January 1889, in the action near Lwekaw, Eastern Karenni, Burma (now Myanmar), a lieutenant and four men charged into a large body of the enemy and two men were wounded. Surgeon John Crimmin attended one of them under enemy fire and he then joined the firing line and helped in driving the enemy from small clumps of trees where they had taken shelter. Later while Surgeon Crimmin was attending a wounded man several of the enemy rushed out at him. He thrust his sword through one of them, attacked a second and a third dropped from the fire of a sepoy. The remainder fled.

He later achieved the rank of Colonel and served in the Indian Medical Service, for which was appointed a Companion of the Order of the Indian Empire (CIE) in 1901.

He died at Woodward House, Wells, Somerset, 20 February 1945.

References

The Register of the Victoria Cross (1981, 1988 and 1997)

Ireland's VCs (Dept of Economic Development, 1995)
Monuments to Courage (David Harvey, 1999)
Irish Winners of the Victoria Cross (Richard Doherty & David Truesdale, 2000)

External links
Location of grave and VC medal (Somerset)
Colonel J. Crimmin

1859 births
1945 deaths
Burials in Somerset
Irish recipients of the Victoria Cross
Companions of the Order of the Indian Empire
Companions of the Order of the Bath
19th-century Irish medical doctors
Irish soldiers in the British Indian Army
Military personnel from Dublin (city)
Indian Medical Service officers
Medical doctors from Dublin (city)